The Hollywood Trident Foundation was formed in 2001 under Jack Palance’s leadership to facilitate contact among professionals working in the entertainment industry who are interested in Ukrainian affairs.

Lobby Efforts

Holodomor
The Hollywood Trident Foundation works closely with the Ukrainian Genocide Famine Foundation to interview film survivors of the Holodomor.  Peter Baristow reports: "When I came to Chicago last year to interview survivors of the Holodomor, I came with childhood memories of tears—the tears cried by my mother as she remembered how her brothers and sisters died of starvation."

Ukrainian Election
Members of the Foundation and others petitioned for a fair, transparent and fully internationally monitored election in Ukraine on December 26, 2004.

References

Hollywood, Los Angeles
Film organizations in the United States
Organizations established in 2001
Ukraine–United States relations